Gopal Man Shrestha (Nepali/Nepal Bhasa:गोपालमान श्रेष्ठ) is a Nepalese politician. He was elected to the Pratinidhi Sabha in the 1999 election on behalf of the Nepali Congress.
He was Acting President of Nepali Congress Democratic. He is now a senior CWC member.
He is currently the deputy Prime Minister and Education Minister under Sher Bahadur Deuba lead Government. He hails from Syangja District.

References

Living people
Nepali Congress politicians from Gandaki Province
Year of birth missing (living people)
Nepal MPs 1991–1994
Nepal MPs 1999–2002
Deputy Prime Ministers of Nepal
Education ministers of Nepal

Members of the 1st Nepalese Constituent Assembly
Members of the 2nd Nepalese Constituent Assembly